The 29th Division War Memorial is a war memorial beside the junction of the A45 and the B4455 near Stretton-on-Dunsmore, near Rugby, Warwickshire. It commemorates the service of the British 29th Division during the First World War. The memorial became a Grade II listed building in 1987, upgraded to Grade II* in 2015, and it is described by Historic England as "probably the most significant single memorial in Britain associated with the Gallipoli campaign".

Background
The 29th Division was assembled in the East Midlands from late 1914, from largely regular army units returned from garrison duty in various parts of the British Empire.

Soon afterwards, the 29th Division left England for war service abroad: with the Royal Naval Division, the Australian and New Zealand Army Corps and the French Corps expéditionnaire d'Orient, it formed the Mediterranean Expeditionary Force that landed on the Gallipoli peninsula in April 1915.

The British forces withdrew in January 1916 and the 29th Division was redeployed to France, serving on the Western Front, including the first day of the Battle of the Somme, and also at the Battle of Arras and the Third Battle of Ypres (Passchendaele), and then was part of the British Army of the Rhine that occupied parts of Germany after the Armistice. By the time it was disbanded in March 1919, the division had suffered some 94,000 casualties.

Memorial
The memorial was designed and constructed by Robert Bridgeman and Sons from Lichfield. It comprises a tapering  monolith of Portland stone topped by a stone urn with crown and orb, standing on a square pedestal. The north side of the pedestal bears the red triangle insignia of the division, above which is a panel with the inscription:

"HERE / IN THE CENTRE OF ENGLAND / WHERE TELFORD'S COACHING-ROAD / FROM LONDON TO HOLYHEAD / IS CROSSED BY THE ROMAN FOSSE WAY / ON THE 12TH OF MARCH 1915 / HIS MAJESTY KING GEORGE V / REVIEWED HIS TROOPS / OF THE IMMORTAL / XXIX DIVISION / SHORTLY BEFORE THEY EMBARKED / FOR ACTIVE SERVICE / IN GALLIPOLI" and carries on in smaller type "IN MEMORY OF THEIR STAY IN WARWICKSHIRE / 1914-15 AND OF THEIR INCOMPARABLE SERVICES / SINCE THE AVENUE ON THIS ROAD WAS REPLANTED / AND THIS MONUMENT ERECTED BY / INHABITANTS OF THE COUNTY". Inscriptions on the base of the pedestal record the division's order of battle.

It was erected after the war, near the place where the 29th Division was reviewed in 1915. The £646 cost was raised from public subscriptions, and £720 donated by John Montagu Douglas Scott, 7th Duke of Buccleuch who also donated the land for the memorial.

The memorial was unveiled by the Lord Lieutenant of Warwickshire William Craven, 4th Earl of Craven at a ceremony attended by over 7,000 people on 24 May 1921, Empire Day. It was accepted by the Chairman of Warwickshire County Council Lord Algernon Percy and dedicated by the Bishop of Coventry Huyshe Yeatman-Biggs.

The memorial stands in circle of gravel with an avenue of lime trees. Two captured field guns were displayed to either side of the memorial, but it is believed that they were removed as scrap metal during the Second World War.

The site is now within a roundabout installed in the mid-1980s at the junction of the A45 (close to the A5 route from London to Holyhead which follows the line of the Roman Watling Street) and the B4455 (part of the Roman Fosse Way from Exeter to Lincoln). The memorial became a Grade II listed building in 1987, upgraded to Grade II* in March 2015

See also

Lancashire Fusiliers War Memorial, memorial to a regiment which fought as part of the 29th Division
Grade II* listed buildings in Rugby (borough)
Grade II* listed war memorials in England

References
 
 29th Division Column, Imperial War Museum
 29th Division Column, War Memorials Online
 The Incomparable 29th Division
 29th Division, The Long, Long Trail
 Gallipoli troops of the 'Immortal 29th Division' remembered 100 years after parade for the King, 27 March 2015 
 War Memorial on London Road, Stretton on Dunsmore, near Rugby, Warwickshire, Our Warwickshire
 War Memorial on London Road, Stretton on Dunsmore, near Rugby, Warwickshire, Warwickshire County Council

Grade II* listed monuments and memorials
Grade II* listed buildings in Warwickshire
Monuments and memorials in Warwickshire
World War I memorials in England
Buildings and structures completed in 1921